James Charlie Miles (born August 8, 1943) was is a retired American professional baseball pitcher who appeared in thirteen games in Major League Baseball (MLB) for the Washington Senators over parts of the  and  seasons, including one start. He attended Delta State University.

Miles spent seven years (1966–1972) in professional baseball, all of them in the Washington/Texas Rangers organization. His MLB stints consisted of a three-game, late-season callup to Washington in 1968, then ten games during the following year. In his only start, on August 13, 1969, against the Kansas City Royals at Robert F. Kennedy Stadium, Miles lasted only two-plus innings, allowing three hits, three bases on balls, and five earned runs, and was tagged with the loss as Kansas City won, 7–3. It was Miles' only MLB decision. Overall, he permitted 27 hits and 17 walks in 24 innings pitched, with 20 strikeouts, in his big-league career.

References

External links

1943 births
Living people
Baseball players from Mississippi
Buffalo Bisons (minor league) players
Burlington Senators players
Delta State Statesmen baseball players
Denver Bears players
Geneva Senators players
Major League Baseball pitchers
People from Grenada, Mississippi
Savannah Senators players
Washington Senators (1961–1971) players